The Sixth Municipality (In Italian: Sesta Municipalità or Municipalità 6) is one of the ten boroughs in which the Italian city of Naples is divided. It is the largest municipality in the city by surface area.

Geography
The municipality represents the easternmost suburb of the city and borders with Portici, San Giorgio a Cremano, San Sebastiano al Vesuvio, Cercola, Volla and Casoria.

Its territory includes the zone of Pietrarsa, in front of San Giorgio, famous for the railway museum.

Administrative division
The Sixth Municipality is divided into 3 quarters:

References

External links
 Municipalità 6 page on Naples website

Municipality 06